Handball at the 2011 Pan Arab Games will be held in Doha, Qatar from December 10 to 21, 2011. In this tournament, 11 teams will play in the men's competition, and 4 teams will participate in the women's competition. It is yet unknown whether the Tunisian team will field a different team from the World championship squad. Kuwait withdrew from the tournament.

Results

Men

Preliminary round

Group A

Group B

Final round

Semifinals

Bronze medal match

Gold medal match

Final standing

Women

Final round

Final standing

External links
 Handball results - arabgames2011.qa 

2011
Events at the 2011 Pan Arab Games